Donald Crabb is a former association football player who represented New Zealand at international level.

Crabb played two official A-international matches for the All Whites in 1933 against trans-Tasman neighbours Australia as part of a 13 match tour, the first a 2–4 loss on 5 June 1933, his second a 4–6 loss on 17 June.

References

Year of birth missing (living people)
Living people
New Zealand association footballers
New Zealand international footballers
Association footballers not categorized by position